Esparragosa de Lares is a municipality in the province of Badajoz, Extremadura, Spain. It has a population of 1,066 and an area of 209 km².

References

Municipalities in the Province of Badajoz